Romel Andrews (born July 4, 1963) is a former American football defensive end who played eight seasons in the Canadian Football League with the Hamilton Tiger-Cats and Winnipeg Blue Bombers. He played college football at the University of Tennessee at Martin and attended Ripley High School in Ripley, Tennessee.

Early years
Andrews played high school football for the Ripley High School Tigers. He also participated in track and field for the Tigers.

College career
Andrews played for the Tennessee Pacers from 1981 to 1985, earning All-Conference All-Star honors.

Professional career

Hamilton Tiger-Cats
Andrews was signed by the Hamilton Tiger-Cats in August 1986 and released by the team in August 1988.

Winnipeg Blue Bombers
Andrews played for the Blue Bombers from 1988 to 1989.

Washington Redskins
Andrews signed with the Washington Redskins in March 1990. He was released by the Redskins during training camp.

Hamilton Tiger-Cats
Andrews was signed by the Hamilton Tiger-Cats in September 1990 and played for the team from 1990 to 1994. He became a free agent in February 1995.

References

External links
Just Sports Stats

Living people
1963 births
Players of American football from Tennessee
American football defensive ends
Canadian football defensive linemen
African-American players of American football
African-American players of Canadian football
UT Martin Skyhawks football players
Hamilton Tiger-Cats players
Winnipeg Blue Bombers players
People from Ripley, Tennessee
21st-century African-American people
20th-century African-American sportspeople